Canada competed at the 1936 Winter Olympics in Garmisch-Partenkirchen, Germany. Canada has competed at every Winter Olympic Games.
Canadian Olympic Committee secretary-treasurer Fred Marples served as head of mission for the Canadian delegation to the Olympics and oversaw all travel arrangements. Amateur Athletic Union of Canada president W. A. Fry self-published a book covering Canadian achievements at the 1936 Winter Olympics and 1936 Summer Olympics. His 1936 book, Canada at eleventh Olympiad 1936 in Germany : Garmisch-Partenkirchen, February 6th to 13th, Berlin, August 1st to 16th, was printed by the Dunnville Chronicle presses and subtitled an official report of the Canadian Olympic Committee. He wrote that Canadians did very well at the 1936 Olympic games despite having one-tenth of the population of other countries. He opined that the length of the Canadian winter negatively affected summer training, and that Canadian athletes were underfunded compared to other countries.

Medalists

Alpine skiing

Men

Women

Cross-country skiing

Men

Figure skating

Men

Women

Pairs

Ice hockey

Group A
Top two teams advanced to semifinals

Group A
Top two teams advanced to Medal Round

Medal Round

Relevant results from the semifinal were carried over to the final

Top scorer

Canada was represented by the 1935 Allan Cup runners-up Port Arthur Bearcats, as the Allan Cup champion Halifax Wolverines (and their league) had disbanded.

Nordic combined 

Events:
 18 km cross-country skiing
 normal hill ski jumping

The cross-country skiing part of this event was combined with the main medal event of cross-country skiing. Those results can be found above in this article in the cross-country skiing section. Some athletes (but not all) entered in both the cross-country skiing and Nordic combined event, their time on the 18 km was used for both events.

The ski jumping (normal hill) event was held separate from the main medal event of ski jumping, results can be found in the table below.

Ski jumping

Speed skating

Men

Official outfitter

 HBC was the official outfitter of clothing for members of the Canadian Olympic team.

Sources

 Olympic Winter Games 1936, full results by sports-reference.com

References

Nations at the 1936 Winter Olympics
1936
Olympics, Winter